Edgefield Little Wood is a  biological Site of Special Scientific Interest south of Holt in Norfolk.

This is coppice with standards ancient woodland on acidic sands and gravels. Oaks which have been coppiced in the past have stools which are so tall that the wood resembles high forest. It is surrounded by ancient boundary banks.

There is access from Plumstead Road.

References

Sites of Special Scientific Interest in Norfolk